Amitriptyline/chlordiazepoxide, sold under the brand names Limbitrol and Limbitrol DS, is a combination of amitriptyline (Elavil), a tricyclic antidepressant, and chlordiazepoxide (Librium), a benzodiazepine, which is approved for the treatment of moderate to severe depression associated with moderate to severe anxiety in the United States. It contains 12.5 to 25 mg amitriptyline and 5 to 10 mg chlordiazepoxide per tablet.

References

Anxiolytics
Benzodiazepines
Combination drugs
Tricyclic antidepressants